Ennio Coltorti (born 21 March 1949) is an Italian actor and voice actor.

Biography
Born in Rome, Coltorti attended the Silvio D'Amico National Academy of Dramatic Arts and began acting and directing on stage since 1981 and he has since collaborated with Sergio Castellitto, Fiorenzo Fiorentini, Valeria Valeri, Ennio Fantastichini and more. He also had roles on film and television.

Since the late 1980s, Coltorti has focused on voice acting and dubbing. He is the official Italian voice of Harvey Keitel and he has also dubbed Willem Dafoe, J. K. Simmons, Billy Bob Thornton, Sam Shepard, Scott Glenn, Tom Waits and Martin Sheen in some of their films. Coltorti's popular character dubbing roles include Agent Smith (portrayed by Hugo Weaving) in The Matrix franchise and Professor X (portrayed by Patrick Stewart) in the X-Men film series. In his animated roles, he dubbed Fillmore in the Cars franchise.

Personal life
Coltorti is the father of actor and voice actor .

Filmography

Cinema
The Nymph (1996)
Li chiamarono... briganti! (1999)
Hannibal (2001)
L'uomo privato (2007)

Dubbing roles

Animation
Fillmore in Cars
Fillmore in Cars 2
Fillmore in Cars 3
Kerchak in Tarzan
Kerchak in Tarzan II
Yao in Mulan
Yao in Mulan II
Thorny in A Bug's Life
Grebs in Antz
Soto in Ice Age
Oogie Boogie in The Nightmare Before Christmas
Jasper in 101 Dalmatians II: Patch's London Adventure
Amos Slade in The Fox and the Hound 2
Mr. Woolensworth in Chicken Little
Melephant Brooks in Toy Story 4
Houston in Space Chimps
Philoctetes in Hercules: The Animated Series
Philoctetes in Disney's House of Mouse
The Scotsman in Samurai Jack
Jeb in Home on the Range
Gondo in Isle of Dogs
The Swarm Lord in The Magic Voyage
The Skull in Bartok the Magnificent

Live action
Auggie Wren in Smoke
Auggie Wren in Blue in the Face
Peter Sadusky in National Treasure
Peter Sadusky in National Treasure: Book of Secrets
Agent Smith in The Matrix
Agent Smith in The Matrix Reloaded
Agent Smith in The Matrix Revolutions
Charles Xavier / Professor X in X-Men
Charles Xavier / Professor X in X2
Charles Xavier / Professor X in X-Men: The Last Stand
Charles Xavier / Professor X in X-Men Origins: Wolverine
Charles Xavier / Professor X in The Wolverine
Charles Xavier / Professor X in X-Men: Days of Future Past
Charles Xavier / Professor X in Logan
Rocco Klein in Clockers
George in Head Above Water
Harry Houdini in FairyTale: A True Story
Izzy Maurer in Lulu on the Bridge
P.J. Waters in Holy Smoke!
Satan in Little Nicky
Henry Klough in U-571
Jack Crawford in Red Dragon
Uncle Pio in The Bridge of San Luis Rey
Nick Carr in Be Cool
Weldon Parish in Shadows in the Sun
Nino in Wrong Turn at Tahoe
OSS Commander in Inglourious Basterds
Randall Weir in Little Fockers
Duke White in A Beginner's Guide to Endings
Commander Pierce in Moonrise Kingdom
Ludwig in The Grand Budapest Hotel
Al in The Congress
Smiley Harris in The Ridiculous 6
John P. O'Neill in The Path to 9/11
Gene Hunt in Life on Mars
Eric Pollack in The Pledge
Frank Calhoun in The Notebook
Narrator in Charlotte's Web
Robert Rayburn in Bloodline
Wilder Lloyd in The Accidental Husband
James Blackthorn / Butch Cassidy in Blackthorn
Dillon in Killing Them Softly
Tom Blankenship in Mud
Beverly Weston in August: Osage County
Gerald "Red" Baze in Out of the Furnace
Ben Russell in Cold in July
Lonnie Earl Dodd in Waking Up in Reno
Howard D. Doyle in Intolerable Cruelty
Davy Crockett in The Alamo
Willie T. Soke in Bad Santa
Willie T. Soke in Bad Santa 2
Dwight Dickham in The Judge
Gas in Existenz
Armando Barillo in Once Upon a Time in Mexico
Klaus Daimler in The Life Aquatic with Steve Zissou
Chief of Staff in American Dreamz
John Darius in Inside Man
 Gavner Purl in Cirque du Freak: The Vampire's Assistant
Hank Havenhurst in My Son, My Son, What Have Ye Done
Nuidis Vulko in Aquaman
Walter E. Kurtz in Apocalypse Now Redux
Frank Black in Millennium
Tom Doss in Hacksaw Ridge
Tom in Coffee and Cigarettes
Zachariah Rigby in Seven Psychopaths
Waller in The Old Man & the Gun
Hermit Bob in The Dead Don't Die
Ebenezer Scrooge in The Muppet Christmas Carol
Comte de Reynaud in Chocolat
Diego Rivera in Frida
John King Fisher in Texas Rangers
Mellersh Wilkins in Enchanted April
Harvey "The Sorcerer" Torriti in The Company
Robert Aldrich in Feud
Ramsley in The Haunted Mansion
Lando Calrissian in Star Wars: Episode IX – The Rise of Skywalker
Bill Burton in Absolute Power
Roger in Training Day
Jack Buggit in The Shipping News
Sgt. Robert E. Lee in Buffalo Soldiers
Steve Gruwell in Freedom Writers
The Wise Man / The General / The Bus Driver in Sucker Punch
Ezra Kramer in The Bourne Legacy
Ted Slocum in The Mexican
BR in Thank You for Smoking
Dr. Bertleman in Barefoot
Randall Zipper in The Meddler
Roland Hunt in Father Figures
James Gordon in Justice League
Jasper in 101 Dalmatians
Jürgen Mossack in The Laundromat
Alan Blunt in Stormbreaker
Rufus Scrimgeour in Harry Potter and the Deathly Hallows – Part 1
Mick Dundee in Crocodile Dundee in Los Angeles
Tramp in The Great Muppet Caper
Jason Wynn in Spawn
Roger Strong in Catch Me If You Can
Ben Parker in The Amazing Spider-Man
Glenn Warburg in Ask Me Anything
Owen Granger in NCIS: Los Angeles

References

External links

 Official Website
 
 
 
 
 

1949 births
Living people
Male actors from Rome
Italian male stage actors
Italian male voice actors
Italian male film actors
Italian male television actors
Italian theatre directors
Italian television directors
Accademia Nazionale di Arte Drammatica Silvio D'Amico alumni
20th-century Italian male actors
21st-century Italian male actors